Jay Baker (born 6 October 1991) is a Welsh rugby union player who plays for Ospreys as a winger.

Baker made his debut for the Ospreys in 2016 against Harlequins having previously played for the Ospreys academy and Aberavon RFC.

References

External links 
Ospreys Player Profile

Welsh rugby union players
Ospreys (rugby union) players
Living people
1991 births
Rugby union wings